Dahr Safra is a Syrian village in the Baniyas District in Tartous Governorate. According to the Syria Central Bureau of Statistics (CBS), Dahr Safra had a population of 1,019 in the 2004 census.

References

Eastern Orthodox Christian communities in Syria
Populated places in Baniyas District